Music Is the Answer is a Cantopop album by Edmond Leung.

Track listing
Music Is the Answer  (Instrumental Music)
Start a new life (重新做人)
Do not love (不愛就不愛)
Hard (掯)
Superhero (超級英雄)
Cough out (咳出來)
Breathing difficulty(呼吸困難)
Fast-rhythm song (快歌)
Slow-rhythm song (慢歌)
Blow a kiss (飛天吻)
Silent film (默片)
Special acknowledgement (特別鳴謝)

Music Awards

External links

Edmond Leung albums
2001 albums